Michael John Rowlands is a retired British academic and anthropologist. He was Professor of Anthropology and Material Culture at University College London from 1993 to 2010.

Career 
Rowlands graduated from the University of London with a BSc in anthropology and went on complete a PhD there. He was appointed Lecturer in Anthropology at University College London (UCL) in 1973 and was promoted to a readership in 1982, after which he was Professor of Anthropology and Material Culture at UCL from 1993 to 2010. He was also Head of the Department of Anthropology there from 1992 to 1996. Since retiring in 2010, Rowlands has been an emeritus professor and senior research fellow at UCL; since 2012, he has also been an honorary professor at the UCL Institute of Archaeology.

Research 
According to his departmental profile, Rowlands's research "include the theorisation and conceptualisation of cultural heritage and material culture".

Publications 

 (Edited with Colin Renfrew and Barbara Segraves) Theory and Explanation in Archaeology: The Southampton Conference (Academic Press, 1982).
 (Edited with Mogens Larsen and Kristian Kristiansen) Centre and Periphery in the Ancient World (Cambridge University Press, 1987).
 (Edited with Daniel Miller and Christopher Tilley) Domination and Resistance (Allen and Unwin, 1989).
 (Co-authored with Daniel Miller, Nigel Thrift, Beverly Holbrook and Peter Jackson) Shopping, Place and Identity (Routledge, 1998).
 (Co-authored Kristian Kristiansen) Social Transformations in Archaeology: Global and Local Perspectives (Routledge, 1998).
 (Co-edited with Christopher Tilley, Webb Keane, Susanne Küchler and Patricia Spyer) Handbook of Material Culture (Sage, 2006).
 (Co-edited with Ferdinand de Jong) Reclaiming Heritage (Left Coast Press, 2007).

References 

Living people
British anthropologists
Alumni of the University of London
Academics of University College London
Year of birth missing (living people)